Albert Leroy Marsh, (August 16, 1877 – September 17, 1944) was an American metallurgist.  In 1905 he co-invented the first metallic alloy from which a high-resistance wire could be made that could be used as a durable and safe heating element. While working at Hoskins Manufacturing, the company of chemist, electrical engineer, inventor and entrepreneur William Hoskins (1862–1934) the two experimented for several years until the alloy was perfected. The material was patented that year as chromel, later and still today marketed as nichrome. For this invention, Marsh was acclaimed as "father of the electrical heating industry".

Early life
Marsh was born August 16, 1877, in Pontiac, Illinois, the oldest of three children. The family moved to Pana, Illinois, in 1884. Marsh went to University of Illinois at Urbana-Champaign. In 1901, Albert received his Bachelor of Science degree in chemical engineering. The same year, he married Minnie E Hayward in Massachusetts.

Career beginnings

While working with an electric storage battery and doing technical writing, he experimented with nickel and chromium alloys in his spare time. In 1904, needing a better location to work on his wiring project and additional funding, he made a business arrangement with William Hoskins of Chicago. Hoskins was with Mariner & Hoskins, a firm of consulting chemists. He hired Marsh at a small salary – while giving him permission to work on the alloy project in his spare time. When later formed as Hoskins Manufacturing Company, the business relocated to Detroit, Michigan.

Success
When perfected, the new alloy was 300 times stronger than other types at that time. Chromel is made of 80% nickel and 20% chromium (though other ratios are used for special purpose nichrome applications).  The US patent was granted February 1906, in Marsh's name, and later sold to Hoskins Manufacturing.

By Hoskins's own account, he was deeply involved in the experimentation process, and not simply a funder.

Toasters, dental furnaces and chromel wire for home appliance manufacturers were the first focus of the Hoskins company. The first two were unprofitable and were later dropped. The company concentrated on manufacturing the chromel wire.

Marsh served as chief engineer and general manager of Hoskins Manufacturing Co. in Detroit. He was named president of the firm in 1915.

Awards
In 1936, Marsh was awarded the John Price Wetherill Medal of The Franklin Institute for "significant and timely contribution to the science of automotive engineering" and "for outstanding discoveries in the physical sciences".

In 1941, the American Metals Congress bestowed upon Marsh with The Sauveur Award for outstanding metallurgical achievement.

References

External links
Albert Marsh, Inventor, Scientist

American inventors
1944 deaths
People from Lake County, Illinois
1877 births
People from Pontiac, Illinois
People from Pana, Illinois